The  was an army of the Imperial Japanese Army during the final days of World War II.

History 
The Japanese 53rd Army was formed on April 8, 1945, under the Japanese 12th Area Army, as part of the last desperate defense effort by the Empire of Japan to deter possible landings of Allied forces in central Honshū during Operation Downfall. The Japanese 53rd Army was based in Isehara, Kanagawa Prefecture and was thus intended to guard the western approaches and beachheads to Tokyo along Sagami Bay. It consisted mostly of poorly trained reservists, conscripted students and Volunteer Fighting Corps home guard militia. It was demobilized at the surrender of Japan on August 15, 1945, without having seen combat.

List of Commanders

References

Bibliography

External links 

53
Military units and formations established in 1945
Military units and formations disestablished in 1945